Warren M. Briggs (June 30, 1923 – October 1, 2012) was an American politician. He served as a Democratic member for the 2nd district of the Florida House of Representatives.

Life and career 
Briggs was born in Saint Paul, Minnesota. He served in the United States Air Force.

In 1966, Briggs was elected to the Florida House of Representatives. The next year, he was elected as the first representative for the newly-established 2nd district. He served until 1968, when he was succeeded by Gordon Tyrrell.

Briggs was mayor of Pensacola, Florida from 1977 to 1978.

Briggs died in October 2012, at the age of 89.

References 

1923 births
2012 deaths
Politicians from Saint Paul, Minnesota
Democratic Party members of the Florida House of Representatives
20th-century American politicians
Mayors of Pensacola, Florida